
Year 1554 (MDLIV) was a common year starting on Monday (link will display the full calendar) of the Julian calendar.

Events

January–June 
 January 5 – A great fire breaks out in Eindhoven, Netherlands.
January 11 – A Spanish army is defeated by local Mapuche-Huilliches as it tries to cross Bueno River in Southern Chile.
 January 12 – Bayinnaung is crowned king of the Burmese Taungoo Dynasty.
 January 25 – São Paulo, Brazil, is founded.
 February 9 – Thomas Wyatt surrenders to government forces in London.
 February 12 – After claiming the throne of England the previous year, Lady Jane Grey is beheaded for treason.
 March 18 – Princess Elizabeth is imprisoned in the Tower of London.
 April 12 – Mary of Guise becomes Regent of Scotland.

July–December 
 July 23–25 – Queen Mary I of England marries King Philip of Naples, the only son of Charles V, Holy Roman Emperor, in Winchester, England.
 August 2 – Battle of Marciano: Senese–French forces are defeated by the Florentine–Imperial army.
 August 12 – Battle of Renty: French forces led by Francis, Duke of Guise turn back an invasion of Picardy, by Charles V.
 November – English captain John Lok voyages to the Guinea Coast.

Date unknown 
 Mikael Agricola becomes the bishop of Turku.
 Saadi conquers the Kingdom of Fez.
 Exact center year of Counter Reformation.
 The name of the beer brewed by New Belgium Brewing Company is based on a recipe from this date, called "1554."
 Luso-Chinese agreement: Portugal reaches an agreement with the Ming Dynasty of China, to be allowed to legally trade in the province of Guangdong.
 Rao Surjan Singh becomes ruler of Bundi.

Births 

 January 1 – Louis III, Duke of Württemberg (d. 1593)
 January 9 – Pope Gregory XV (d. 1623)
 January 20 – King Sebastian of Portugal (d. 1578)
 February 8 – Marina de Escobar, Spanish nun (d. 1633)
 February 27 – Giovanni Battista Paggi, Italian painter (d. 1627)
 March – Richard Hooker, Anglican theologian (d. 1600)
 March 1 – William Stafford, English courtier and conspirator (d. 1612)
 March 18 – Josias I, Count of Waldeck-Eisenberg, Count of Waldeck-Eisenberg (1578-1588) (d. 1588)
 March 22 – Catherine de Parthenay, French noblewoman and mathematician (d. 1631)
 March 26 – Charles of Lorraine, Duke of Mayenne, French military leader (d. 1611)
 March 28 – Tsarevich Ivan Ivanovich of Russia (d. 1581)
 March 30 – Paul Laurentius, German divine (d. 1624)
 April – Stephen Gosson, English satirist (d. 1624)
 April 15 – Simon VI, Count of Lippe, Count of Lippe-Detmold (1563-1613) (d. 1613)
 May 20 – Paolo Bellasio, Italian composer (d. 1594)
 June 3 – Pietro de' Medici, Italian noble (d. 1604)
 June 5 – Benedetto Giustiniani, Italian Catholic cardinal (d. 1621)
 June 21 – Joachim of Zollern, Titular Count of Hohenzollern (d. 1587)
 July 5 – Elisabeth of Austria, Queen of France (d. 1592)
 October 1 – Leonardus Lessius, Jesuit theologian (d. 1623)
 October 3 – Fulke Greville, 1st Baron Brooke, English poet (d. 1628)
 October 10 – Arnold III, Count of Bentheim-Steinfurt-Tecklenburg-Limburg and Lord of Rheda (d. 1606)
 October 20 – Bálint Balassi, Hungarian writer and noble (d. 1594)
 October 28 – Enevold Kruse, Danish noble (d. 1621)
 October 30 – Prospero Farinacci, Italian jurist (d. 1618)
 November 30 – Sir Philip Sidney, English courtier and poet (d. 1586)

 December 17 – Ernest of Bavaria, Roman Catholic bishop (d. 1612)
 December 19 – Philip William, Prince of Orange (d. 1618)
 date unknown
 Jacques Bongars, French scholar and diplomat (d. 1612)
 James Lancaster, English navigator (d. 1618)
 Walter Raleigh, English writer, poet, and explorer (d. 1618)
 Francis Throckmorton, English conspirator (d. 1584)

Deaths 

 January 2 – João Manuel, Prince of Portugal, Portuguese prince (b. 1537)
 January 11 – Min Bin, king of Arakan (b. 1493)
 January 16
 Christiern Pedersen, Danish humanist (b. c. 1480)
 Ambrosius Moibanus, German theologian (b. 1494)
 February 12
 Lord Guildford Dudley, consort of Lady Jane Grey (executed) (b. 1536)
 Lady Jane Grey, claimant to the throne of England (executed) (b. 1537)
 February 21 
 Hieronymus Bock, German botanist (b. 1498)
 Sibylle of Cleves, Electress consort of Saxony (b. 1512)
 February 23 – Henry Grey, 1st Duke of Suffolk, English politician (executed) (b. c.1515)
 March 3 – John Frederick I, Elector of Saxony (b. 1503)
 April 11 – Thomas Wyatt the Younger, English rebel (executed) (b. 1521)
 April 23 – Gaspara Stampa, Italian poet (b. 1523)
 May 2 – William Waldegrave, English Member of Parliament (b. 1507)
 June 19 
 Sixt Birck, German humanist (b. 1501)
 Philip II, Count of Nassau-Saarbrücken, German noble (b. 1509)
 June 28 – Leone Strozzi, French Navy admiral (b. 1515)
 August 25 – Thomas Howard, 3rd Duke of Norfolk, English politician (b. 1473)
 September 22 – Francisco Vázquez de Coronado, Spanish conquistador (b. c. 1510)
 December 22 – Alessandro Bonvicino, Italian painter (b. 1498)
 December – John Taylor, Bishop of Lincoln (b. 1503)
 approx. date – Susannah Hornebolt, English artist (b. 1503)
 date unknown
Argula von Grumbach, German Protestant reformer (b. 1492)
Leo Africanus, Andalusian Berber writer (b. 1485)
Sebastiano Serlio, Italian architect (b. 1475)
 Sir Hugh Willoughby, English Arctic explorer

References